Mia Soteriou is a British musician and actress. Soteriou was born in London. She studied piano at the Royal College of Music and English at Oxford University.

Musical career 
Soteriou has written music for and played in numerous stage productions, including Bob Eaton's Stags and Hens, Blood Red Roses and Lennon, where she played Yoko Ono. Her music for La Lupa (2001) and THe dYsFUnCKshOnalZ! (2007) was favourably mentioned in reviews.

On screen, among other roles, Soteriou appeared in the supporting role of Arina in the musical film Mamma Mia! (2008), for which she also worked as vocal coach. In television, she was cast as P.C. Paula Campbell in EastEnders (2003), as Dr. Sanghita Parma in Holby City (2007) and as Mirri Maz Duur in Game of Thrones (2011), among other productions.

References

External links

British composers
British actresses
Living people
People educated at Lady Margaret School
English people of Lebanese descent
British people of Greek descent
Year of birth missing (living people)